Paul Kirtley (born 17 January 1973) is a professional wilderness bushcraft instructor and noted writer on the subjects of bushcraft, wilderness travel and survival.

Career history
Kirtley embarked on a professional career in bushcraft after attending courses run by world-renowned bushcraft expert Ray Mears. Kirtley worked for Mears from 2003 - 2010. In 2005 Mears offered Kirtley the position of Course Director at his bushcraft school Woodlore. Kirtley held this position full-time from 2007–2010, during which time he added new courses to the Woodlore programme, led courses in the UK as well as assisting Lars Fält on courses in Sweden.

Kirtley left Woodlore in 2010 to pursue other opportunities within outdoor education, including starting his own wilderness skills training company and writing a blog.

Wilderness bushcraft blog
Kirtley now authors a regarded Wilderness Bushcraft Blog posting articles on bushcraft skills, tracking, wild foods and wilderness first aid.

Kirtley's work has been gaining interest within the bushcraft community, where his articles are regarded as well written and accurate.

Bushcraft school
In 2010 Kirtley set up his own bushcraft school called Frontier Bushcraft. The school has rapidly established itself as one of the leading bushcraft schools in the UK and in its first year was short-listed as finalist in the Bushcraft & Survival Skills Magazine best in bushcraft awards.

References

External links 
paulkirtley.co.uk

1973 births
Living people
Survivalists